The Greyhound was an express passenger steamer that operated from the 1890s to about 1915 on Puget Sound in Washington, United States.  This vessel, commonly known as the Hound, the Pup, or the Dog, was of unusual design, having small upper works, but an enormous sternwheel.  Unlike many sternwheelers, she was not intended for a dual role as passenger and freighter, but was purpose-built to carry mostly passengers on express runs.

Construction
Greyhound was built at Portland, Oregon by Capt. Claud Troup (1865-1896) in association with Frank W. Goodhue and others. Greyhound was designed by Claude Troup's brother, James W. Troup, one of the most famous of the steamboat captains. She was long and narrow, and considered by some to be too flimsily built, which turned out to be quite wrong, as the Hound as she was called, proved to be a money-making fast moving boat. Twin steam engines of 14.5" bore and 72" stroke drove her enormous sternwheel. Mechanical data included: indicated horsepower 400; single boiler, steel firebox built by Willamette Iron Works, Portland, Oregon. Total grate surface , total heating surface : fuel consumption: 3/4 of one cord of fir wood

Operation

Shortly after completion Greyhound was taken round to the Sound in September by Captain Lewis.  She was built almost exclusively for passenger traffic and showed remarkable speed. Once on Puget Sound Greyhound raced against and beat all the crack boats on the Tacoma and Seattle route.  Greyhound started express passenger service between Seattle and Tacoma on September 7, 1890, with Capt. Howard Bullene in command and Claude Troup acting as chief engineer.  On the very first trip, Greyhound raced and beat the Fleetwood.

Shortly after Greyhound reached Puget Sound, Captain U.B. Scott brought the fast propeller steamer Flyer up from Portland where she too had been built, and put her on the same Tacoma-Seattle run in competition with Greyhound.  In a typical anti-competitive transaction of the time,  Capt. Scott offered the owners of Greyhound a subsidy if they would take her off the route.  Troup agreed, and in November, 1891 he sold her  to the Seattle & Tacoma Navigation Company, of which he was president.  From then until 1903 she was operated on the Everett and Seattle route, making three round trips a day. Captain Troup handled the boat himself most of the time.

Speed

Greyhound,  "all wheel and whistle"  mounted both a greyhound statue on the roof of her pilot house and a broom on her masthead, showing that she'd swept the sea of her competition.  One day she raced against the magnificent Bailey Gatzert, which thereafter mounted both the dog and the broom.

Later career

In 1903, Greyhound was replaced on the Everett route by Telegraph, then a new sternwheeler. Greyhound was sold to a firm that placed her on the route between Olympia and Tacoma, where she ran against the old Willamette River sternwheeler Multnomah and also Capital City, another sternwheeler. Following a rate war, Greyhounds new owners bought both Multnomah and Capital City, to form the Olympia-Tacoma Navigation Company.

Out of service
In 1911 the new propeller steamer Nisqually was built at Quartermaster Harbor and acquired by the Olympia Tacoma Navigation Co. to replace Greyhound, which was then relegated to relief boat service.  By 1924, Greyhound had been out of service for many years, and all that remained was her hull.  She was still in good enough shape to warrant hauling her out in Tacoma in 1924, for repair, caulking and painting.  Just what happened to her hull is not clear, probably it was just left to rot on a beach or a mud bank like so many others had been.

Notes

Further reading
 Carey, Roland, The Steamboat Landing on Elliott Bay, Alderbrook Publishing, Seattle, WA 1962
 Carey, Roland, The Sound of Steamers, Alderbrook Publishing, Seattle, WA 1965
 Faber, Jim, Steamer's Wake, Enetai Press, Seattle, WA 1985 
 Gibbs, Jim, and Williamson, Joe, Maritime Memories of Puget Sound, Schiffer Publishing, West Chester, PA 1987, 
 Kline, Mary S. and Bayless, George A., Ferryboats - A Legend on Puget Sound, Bayless Books, Seattle, WA 1983 
 Newell, Gordon, and Williamson, Joe, Pacific Steamboats, Bonanza Books, New York, NY (1963)

External links

University of Washington image collection
Greyhound, 1891, on Puget Sound  This is a good clear image of the vessel, showing her unusual design and the small but crowded passenger deck.
Greyhound, 1909 This image is taken from the stern of the vessel, which appears to be running at high speed based on the large amount of spray from the sternwheel, the size of the wake, and the amount of smoke coming from the funnel.  The wheel appears quite large in this photograph compared to the rest of the boat.

Steamboats of Washington (state)
Passenger ships of the United States
Ships built in Portland, Oregon